The Nottingham 'Robin Hood' Marathon, is a race in Nottingham, England held every year since 1981. The race today incorporates a half-marathon and a fun-run. A corporate relay event is also held in which teams of five runners from local companies and businesses run legs of 2–3 miles on the half-marathon course.

The original race started and finished in the Old Market Square, in Nottingham City Centre. From 1982 onwards the race has started and finished from the Victoria Embankment taking in some of Nottingham's most historical and scenic sights, including the City Centre and Nottingham Castle, Wollaton Park, the University of Nottingham and the National Watersports Centre at Holme Pierrepont.

In 2005 Runners World Magazine readers voted the race the number two marathon in the United Kingdom.

The full marathon was dropped for the 2012 event because of "issues with the route around Holme Pierrepont". The half-marathon event was held on a revised route. In 2013 the marathon returned after being cancelled in 2012, following revisions to the route to allow for greater participant safety. It was again dropped in 2018 having 'failed to meet the organisers' aspirations'. 

The 2020 event was cancelled due to COVID-19.

Winners 
Key:

Half marathon

Marathon

References 

  List of Robin Hood Half-Marathon and Marathon winners

Race reports
  This is Nottingham: 2008 race report
  This is Nottingham: 2009 race report
  This is Nottingham: 2010 race report
  This is Nottingham: 2011 race report
  This is Nottingham: 2012 race report
  BBC Nottingham: 2004 race report
  BBC Nottingham: 2007 race report
  BBC Nottingham: 2008 race report
  BBC Nottingham: 2011 race report
  BBC Nottingham: 2012 race report

External links
 Official website

Sport in Nottingham
Marathons in the United Kingdom
Half marathons in the United Kingdom
Recurring sporting events established in 1981